"I'm Jealous" is a song written by Ike Turner and Jane Bossung. It was released by Ike & Tina Turner on Sue Records in January 1961. The record was the third single from the duo's debut album The Soul of Ike & Tina Turner.

Critical reception 
The single was chosen as Cash Box's Pick of the Week and one of Billboard's Spotlight Winners of the Week.

Cash Box (February 4, 1961): "Twosome, having clicked with 'A Fool In Love' and 'I Idolize You,' seem to have their third-in-a-row dual mart'er in 'I'm Jealous.' It’s a shufflin' blueser featuring Tina at her wailing best. Ike's instrumentalists and the gal chorus lend a solid backdrop. The coupler, 'You're My Baby,' is another rhythmic shuffler with loads of appeal."

Billboard (January 30, 1961): "Two solid sides. On top, the gal half of the duo goes it alone on a wonderfully effective gospel-inspired performance. Much excitement here. The flip features the duo on a good blues-based ballad. Either side here with an edge to the first. Sides also have pop potential."

Chart performance

References 

1961 singles
1961 songs
Ike & Tina Turner songs
Songs written by Ike Turner
Song recordings produced by Ike Turner
Sue Records singles